Ash Blue Gutierrez (born January 20, 2005), known professionally as glaive, is an American singer, songwriter, and record producer. After posting a string of hyperpop songs to SoundCloud during the beginning of the COVID-19 pandemic that earned him a cult following, he signed a record deal with Interscope Records and released his debut extended play, Cypress Grove, in 2020. His second EP, All Dogs Go to Heaven, and his collaborative EP with ericdoa, Then I'll Be Happy, were released in 2021. The deluxe version of All Dogs Go to Heaven, Old Dog, New Tricks, was released in early 2022. Then followed by his singles ''minnesota is a place that exists'' and ''three wheels and it still drives!'' later that year.

Early life and career
Ash Gutierrez was born on January 20, 2005, in Florida. His father played polo professionally, and his family lived near Sarasota for nine years before moving to Hendersonville, North Carolina. As of 2021, glaive is attending high school. Before pursuing a solo career, he was in a band.

Towards the beginning of the COVID-19 pandemic, while attending high school virtually, glaive began recording music in his bedroom. He uploaded his first song to SoundCloud under the moniker glaive, inspired by a weapon from the 2016 video game Dark Souls III, in April 2020. He began collaborating with other hyperpop artists on SoundCloud after being introduced to them through Discord servers, and through his friend and fellow record producer, kurtains. He quickly became popular on SoundCloud and Dan Awad, glaive's manager, discovered him through his song "sick" in the summer of 2020. Soon after, he started regularly appearing on Spotify's "Hyperpop" playlist and signed a short-term record deal with Interscope Records for two extended plays.

In August 2020, glaive released the single "clover", and in November 2020, he released the single "eyesore". Later that month, his debut extended play, cypress grove, was released through Interscope after he wrote and recorded it in a week. He released the single "cloak n dagger" with Ericdoa in January 2021, a music video for his song "astrid" in February 2021, and the single "i wanna slam my head against the wall" in March 2021. His collaborative single with aldn, "what was the last thing u said", was released in April 2021. In June 2021, he was included on Renforshort's song "fall apart" from her extended play Off Saint Dominique, and released the single "detest me". His single "bastard" was released in July 2021. He released a second EP, all dogs go to heaven, in early August 2021. In October 2021, he released his collaborative EP then i'll be happy with ericdoa. 

Glaive followed with the release of "prick," the lead single off of the deluxe version of "all dogs go to heaven," titled "old dog, new tricks," which would release with four more songs in January 2022, with glaive announcing his first headline tour in support of the release, with opening support from artists aldn and midwxst. The tour featured multiple sellout shows from mid- sized venues in major cities, and lasted from February- March of 2022. While on tour in February 2022, glaive announced via an Instagram story that he will begin work on his debut studio album, which is expected to drop late 2022. Following his North American tour, Glaive began touring Europe as an opening act for The Kid Laroi's "End of the World Tour," from June- July 2022. In June 2022, he released "minnesota is a place that exists," the lead single to release off the album.  He also announced his second North America tour "america is a place that exists," in support of his upcoming album. The tour began in September 2022, and featured support from artists aldn, caspr, and riovaz. He then published his next song "three wheels and it still drives!" in late September 2022. The album has been confirmed to be titled "i care so much that i don't care at all" and is set to release in May 2023.

Musical style
Glaive's music has often been described as hyperpop. He has described his own music as "straight-up pop songs" with "nothing hyper about them", and stated that his music being labeled as hyperpop is a result of him being associated with other people who make hyperpop. He has also been deemed a pioneer of the digicore genre, a more underground, largely teenage offshoot of hyperpop that uses elements of trap and emo rap with a DIY ethic. His music has included elements of Midwest emo, emo, glitch, pop punk, hip hop, trap, EDM, and indie rock. He has described his music as being about "being annoyed or mad", and has stated that he is inspired by hip hop production. His lyrics address topics such as alienation and mental health.

Colin Joyce of The Fader described glaive's songs as "genre-hopping" and "self-assured", while Pigeons and Planes wrote that glaive took a "free-for-all approach" to his music and has "a gift for structure and melody". Vultures Justin Curto called glaive's lyrics "painfully honest", while Jeff Ihaza of Rolling Stone wrote that glaive "has a way with clear-eyed vulnerability". Billboards Andrew Unterberger called glaive a "cutting-edge pop artist"; Daisy Jones of Vice stated that his sound was "sugary, emotive and intuitive".

Discography

Studio albums

Extended plays

Singles

As lead artist

As featured artist

Guest appearances

References

2005 births
21st-century American rappers
21st-century American singers
American child singers
American electronic musicians
Interscope Records artists
Living people
People from Hendersonville, North Carolina
People from Sarasota, Florida
Rappers from Florida
Rappers from North Carolina
Singers from Florida
Singers from North Carolina
Songwriters from Florida
Songwriters from North Carolina
Hyperpop musicians